Ella Hunt (born 29 April 1998) is an English actress and singer. She was nominated for a Scottish BAFTA for her performance in the film Anna and the Apocalypse (2017). On television, she is known for her roles as Ellie Marsden in the ITV comedy-drama Cold Feet (2016–2017) and Sue Gilbert in the Apple TV+ series Dickinson (2019–2021).

Early life
Born in London to sculptor and actress Louise Hunt and art dealer David Grob, Hunt grew up on a farm in Parracombe, North Devon near Barnstaple. She is of Swiss descent on one side. She has an older brother William, a younger brother Arthur, as well as three older half-siblings from her father's first marriage.

Hunt attended Millfield Preparatory School in Somerset and then Blundell's School in Tiverton. She was discovered by an agent when she was in a school production at Millfield at the age of 11.

Career
Beginning as a child actress, Hunt appeared in the 2011 film Intruders, the 2012 film Les Misérables, and the 2014 independent film Robot Overlords. She made her television debut at 18 in 2016 as Ellie Marsden alongside Daisy Edgar-Jones as her twin Olivia in the ITV series Cold Feet.

Hunt starred as Anna Shepherd in the 2018 film Anna and the Apocalypse, which earned her a Scottish BAFTA nomination as well as an ensemble award at the Toronto After Dark Film Festival. She also appeared in the 2019 film Summer Night and starred as Kat Malone in the 2020 film Kat and the Band. In 2018, Hunt was cast as Sue Gilbert in the 2019 Apple TV+ period drama Dickinson.

In April 2020, Hunt released her first single, "Magpie". In November 2021, Hunt released the single "Holding On," followed by the EP Triptych a month later.

Hunt made her professional theatre debut as Alice in the 2022 production of Closer at the Lyric Theatre in Hammersmith alongside Jack Farthing, Sam Troughton, and Nina Toussaint-White.

Personal life
Hunt splits her time between Islington, London and Brooklyn Heights, New York. In March 2021, she came out as queer. She is now in a relationship with Thomas Bartlett.

Discography

Extended plays

Singles

Filmography

Film

Television

Stage

Awards and nominations

References

External links
 
 Official Instagram

Living people
1998 births
21st-century English actresses
Actresses from Devon
Actresses from London
English child actresses
English film actresses
English people of Swiss descent
English television actresses
English LGBT actors
British LGBT singers
People educated at Blundell's School
People educated at Millfield Preparatory School
People from North Devon (district)
People from the City of Westminster
Queer actresses
Queer women